Cocco's lantern fish (Lobianchia gemellarii), also called Gemellar's lanternfish, is a species of lanternfish.

Description

It has 16–18 dorsal soft rays and 13–15 anal soft rays. Males have a supracaudal gland, while females have an infracaudal luminous gland made of two heart-shaped scales, flanked by smaller, triangular luminous scales. It has photophores and a lateral line.

Habitat

Behaviour
Cocco's lantern fish are oviparous, with planktonic eggs and larvae.

References

Myctophidae
Fish described in 1838
Taxa named by Anastasio Cocco